The 1995–96 Scottish Cup was the 111th staging of Scotland's most prestigious football knockout competition. The Cup was won by Rangers who defeated Heart of Midlothian in the final.

First round

Replay

Second round

Replays

Third round

Replays

Fourth round

Replay

Quarter-finals

Semi-finals

Final

See also
1995–96 in Scottish football
1995–96 Scottish League Cup

Scottish Cup seasons
1995–96 in Scottish football
Scot